Micromyrtus ninghanensis is a plant species of the family Myrtaceae endemic to Western Australia.

It blooms in between September and October producing white flowers.

It is found on hills in the Wheatbelt region of Western Australia near Yalgoo where it grows in clay soils over greenstone or granite.

References

ninghanensis
Endemic flora of Western Australia
Myrtales of Australia
Rosids of Western Australia
Endangered flora of Australia
Plants described in 2002
Taxa named by Barbara Lynette Rye